Cilebut Station (CLT) is a railway station located in East Cilebut, Sukaraja, Bogor Regency, West Java that was opened in 1873. The station is located at an altitude of +171 meters above sea level. This station serves KRL Commuterline trains serving Jabodetabek area.

Building and layout 
This station has two railway tracks.

Services
The following is a list of train services at the Cilebut Station

Passenger services 
 KAI Commuter

Intermodal support

References

External links

Bogor Regency
Railway stations in West Java
Railway stations opened in 1873